The 1968 Individual Speedway World Championship was the 23rd edition of the official World Championship to determine the world champion rider.

Ivan Mauger won his first World title. Fellow countryman Barry Briggs finished second and Pole Edward Jancarz took the bronze medal.

Format changes
The format of the Championship changed again for the 1968 event. It reverted back to the 1966 system whereby six riders from the Swedish section would qualify for the World Final direct to be held in Sweden. All other nations had to go through various events to establish the other ten riders to qualify for the final.

First round
British/Commonwealth Qualifying - 16 to British/Commonwealth Final

British/Commonwealth Qualifying

Second round
British/Commonwealth Final - 10 to British/Commonwealth/Nordic Final
Nordic Final - 6 to British/Commonwealth/Nordic Final
Continental Qualifying - 16 to Continental Final

British/Commonwealth Final
 July 11, 1968
 Wimbledon
 First 10 to British-Nordic Final plus 1 reserve

Nordic Final
 June 2, 1968
 Hillerød
 First 6 to British-Nordic Final, plus 1 reserve

Continental Qualifying

Third round
Swedish Qualifying - 16 to Swedish finals
British/Commonwealth/Nordic Final - 8 to European Final
Continental Final - 8 to European Final

Swedish Qualifying

British/Commonwealth/Nordic Final
 August 6, 1968
 West Ham
 First 8 to European Final plus 1 reserve

Continental Final
 June 21, 1968
  Ufa
 First 8 to European Final plus 1 reserve

Fourth round
Swedish Finals - 6 to World Final
European Final - 10 to World Final

Swedish Finals
Three races held on 27 May at Malmo, 28 May at Göteborg and 30 May in Linköping

European Final
 August 25, 1968
  Wroclaw
 First 10 to World Final plus 1 reserve

World Final
September 6, 1968
 Göteborg, Ullevi

References

1968
Speedway
World
Speedway competitions in Poland